The War of the Running Dogs: How Malaya Defeated the Communist Guerrillas, 1948-60 is a 1971 non-fiction history book by British writer Noel Barber about the Malayan Emergency.

References 

Works about the Malayan Emergency
History books about Malaysia
Books about the Cold War
British non-fiction books
1971 non-fiction books